Rosette de Lyon is a cured saucisson from France. It is made from pork and usually served thinly sliced.

See also
Lyonnaise cuisine
 List of sausages

References

External links
 Rosette de Lyon on www.flickr.com

French sausages
Cuisine of Lyon
Fermented sausages